The Ferchland Grieben Ferry is a Diesel engine ferry across the Elbe river between Ferchland and Grieben in Saxony-Anhalt, Germany.

References 

Ferry transport in Saxony-Anhalt
Ferries across Elbe
Cable ferries in Germany